Amara Konaté may refer to:

 Amara Konaté (Ivorian footballer) (born 1990), Ivorian football player
 Amara Konate (Guinean footballer) (born 1999), Guinean football player